Ranjit Sarma (born 21 February 1950, at Guwahati), has worked in the field of film, stage and radio play, film criticism since 1980. Third son of freedom fighter Late Pabindra Nath Sarma and Late Kunjabala Devi.

Work
Two of his books are printed and published namely, Ranjit Sarma’r Nirbasito Sankalan (1998) & Sanglap (1995). He wrote the screenplay of the films named Sankalpa (1986), 31st June (1992), Mimangsa (1994), Raag Biraag (1996), Nisiddha Nodi (1999), Baibhab (1999), Oniyo Ek Yatra (2002), Othello (2014).

Achievements

 Assam Sahitya Sabha Award for Best Drama in 1985 for ‘Sanglap’ 
 Best Dramatist Award for 'Prarthana' in around one act play competitions 
 Best Screenplay Award for  ‘Baibhab’ (1999) at State Film Award Festival, Assam (2005)
 Best Screenplay Award for ‘Othello’ at Indian Cine Film Festival, Mumbai (2014)
 Best Screenplay Award for ‘Othello’ at Prag Cine Awards North-East 2015, Assam
 Radio play ‘Mayar Udvid’ (Enchanted Flora) was broadcast through stations of A.I.R. in Akhil Bharatiya Karjyakram (1998)

References

External links
 Sincere attempt at meaningful cinema at The Hindu
 Intimate exploration of an actor’s agony at The Telegraph 

1950 births
Living people
Writers from Guwahati
Indian male screenwriters
Assam dramatists and playwrights
Screenwriters from Assam